Bubb Lake is located west of Eagle Bay, New York. The outlet creek flows into North Branch Moose River. Fish species present in the lake are brook trout, and brown bullhead. There is carry down access trail off Route 28.

Tributaries and locations
Sis Lake – A small 25 acre lake with a max depth of 7 feet located west of Bubb Lake. The outlet of Sis Lake flows into Bubb Lake. Fish species in Sis Lake include brook trout and brown bullhead.

References

Lakes of New York (state)
Lakes of Herkimer County, New York